Handwara is a sub-district and a town in Kupwara district of Kashmir. It was known as Uttar Machipora until the division of Baramulla district in the 1980s resulting in the formation of two new districts: Kupwara and Bandipora. It is located on Baramulla-Handwara National Highway NH-701 and is governed by a municipal committee.

Geography

Demographics

According to the 2011 Indian census, Handwara has a population of  13,600. Males constitute 54.26% of the population and females 45.74%. Handwara has an average literacy rate of 64.39%. The dominant religion in the town is Islam.

Literacy
The Census of 2011 showed the literacy rate of Handwara at 64.39%, lower than the national average of 67.16%. There is a gender difference in literacy, with a male literacy rate of 75.62% and a much lower female literacy rate of 51.88%.

Educational Institutions
 Government Degree College, Handwara
 Shaheen Public Secondary School, Handwara

Politics
Handwara is in a politically volatile area of Handwara. It was the home constituency of the late separatist leader Abdul Ghani Lone and of Chowdhary Mohammad Ramzaan. The former MLA for Handwara was Sajjad Gani Lone of the Jammu and Kashmir People's Conference, who defeated Chowdhary Mohammad Ramzaan of the Jammu & Kashmir National Conference by more than 5000 votes in the 2014 assembly elections. The current MLA seat of Handwara is vacant due to the dissolving of the Jammu and Kashmir Legislative Assembly in 2018.

Municipal Committee Handwara is an Urban Local Body with 13 elected members, which administers the town.

Transportation

Air
The nearest airport is Sheikh ul-Alam International Airport in Srinagar located 78.8 kilometres from Handwara. There are plans to construct an airport in Panzgam near Kupwara.

Rail
Handwara is not yet connected to railways. The nearest railway station is Baramulla railway station located 30 kilometres from Handwara.

Road
Handwara is well-connected with roads and highways. The NH 701 passes through Handwara alongside other intra-town roads.

Notable people
 Ali Mohammad Shahbaz (Poet)
 Abdul Gani Lone (Politician)
 Sajad Lone (Politician)
 Engineer Rashid (Politician)
  Noor Mohammad (Singer)

References

External links
 

Handwara
Handwara